Killian or Kilian, as a given name, is an Anglicized version of the Irish name Cillian. The name Cillian was borne by several early Irish saints including missionaries to Artois and Franconia and the author of the life of St Brigid.

The name is said to derive from Saint Kilian, an Irish missionary to Germany in the 7th century, who, according to the Acta Sanctorum, was born in Mullagh, County Cavan, Ireland c. 640. He departed for his mission to the continent with 12 apostles from Kilmacologue in the parish of Tuosist, County Kerry, Ireland. In 689 he was martyred in Würzburg, Franconia, Germany, and subsequently became the city's patron saint.

The most likely meaning of the name is "little church", a reference to someone prayerful or spiritual, cill meaning "church" in Gaelic while the suffix "-ín" is used affectionately to indicate a 'pet' or diminutive status. The Rev. Patrick Woulfe wrote that Cillian is the 'pet' diminutive of Ceallach which means "war", "strife" or "bright-headed".

Notable people named Cillian
 Cillian Buckley (born 1992), an Irish hurler
 Cillian Farrell (born 1977), an Irish hurling manager
 Cillian McDaid (born 1997), an Irish Gaelic and Australian rules footballer
 Cillian Morrison, an Irish Gaelic footballer
 Cillian Murphy (born 1976), an Irish actor 
 Cillian O'Connor (born 1992), a Gaelic footballer for Mayo
 Cillian Ryan, an economist and Pro Vice-Chancellor International, Nottingham Trent University
 Cillian Sheridan (born 1987), an Irish professional footballer who plays for Kilmarnock
 Cillian Twomey, a retired consultant physician in geriatric medicine at Cork University and St. Finbarr’s Hospital, Cork, Ireland
 Cillian Vallely, an Irish musician
 Cillian Willis (born 1985), a professional rugby union footballer employed by Leinster Rugby

Notable people named Killian
Killian Brady (born 1990), an Irish Gaelic footballer
Killian Brennan, an Irish footballer currently with the League of Ireland club St Patrick's Athletic
Killian Clarke (born 1993), an Irish Gaelic footballer
Killian Dain, ring name of Northern Irish professional wrestler Damian Mackle
Killian Donnelly, an Irish-born musical theatre performer
Aldrich Killian, supervillain and main antagonist of Iron Man 3
Dan A. Killian, American college sports coach
Edwin Henry Killian (1876–1928), a Major League Baseball pitcher primarily of the Detroit Tigers
Eugene H. Killian (1873–1943), an American politician
George E. Killian, a sports administrator and currently the president of the International University Sports Federation
Gustav Killian (1860–1921), a German laryngologist for whom Killian's dehiscence is named
James Rhyne Killian (1904–1988), the 11th president of the Massachusetts Institute of Technology
Jerry B. Killian, an officer in the Texas Air National Guard in the early 1970s, to whom Lieutenant George W. Bush was a subordinate
Richard Killian, an American businessman and politician
Robert K. Killian (1919–2005), an American politician from the state of Connecticut
Killian Scott, an Irish actor
Killian K. Van Rensselaer (1763–1845), member of the United States House of Representatives from New York
Killian Peier, Swiss ski jumper, 2019 World Championships medalist
Killian Tillie (born 1998), French basketball player
Killian Hayes (born 2001), American–French basketball player

Notable people named Kilian
Saint Kilian, an Irish missionary bishop and the apostle of Franconia
Kilian Elkinson (born 1990), Bermudian footballer 
Kílian Jornet Burgada, a Spanish ski mountaineer, long-distance runner, mountain biker and duathlete
André Kilian, a German-born footballer currently playing for North Queensland Fury
Caleb Kilian (born 1997), American baseball player
Crawford Kilian, a Canadian novelist and a college professor
Hanns Kilian (1905–1981), a German bobsledder who competed from the late 1920s to the late 1930
Inge Kilian (born 1935), a German high jumper
John Kilian (1811–1884), a Lutheran pastor and leader of the colony known as the Wends of Texas
Michael Kilian (1939–2005), author and journalist primarily for the Chicago Tribune in Washington, D.C
Victor Kilian (1891–1979), an American actor blacklisted by the Hollywood movie studio in the 1950s
Wiesław Kilian, a Polish politician

Notable people named Kylian
Kylian Hazard, a Belgian footballer
Kylian Mash (born 1983), French DJ and record producer
Kylian Mbappé, a French footballer

Notable people named Killion
 John Joseph Killion (1859–1937), known as Jake Kilrain, a famous bare knuckle fighter and glove boxer of the 1880s
 Kyle Killion, an American football linebacker
 Redley A. Killion, a Micronesian politician
 Sean Killion, an American swimmer
 Tom Killion, an American politician from Pennsylvania

Places
St Kilian's German School (also known as 'St Kilian's Deutsche Schule'), a school situated in Clonskeagh, Dublin, Ireland
Kilian Island (also known as Elvira Island), an uninhabited island in the Qikiqtaaluk Region, Nunavut, Canada
Kilianstein, a rock formation in Germany
St Killian's College at Carnlough, Northern Ireland
Killian, Louisiana, a village in Livingston Parish
Miami Killian High School, a public high school located in unincorporated Miami-Dade County, Florida
The Killian Nine, a group of students at Miami Killian High School who in February 1999 distributed a controversial satirical pamphlet named "First Amendment" and were arrested for it

Other uses
Kilian family, a lineage of German engravers
Killian's Irish Red Beer, a lager brewed by Coors
The Killian Curse, a New Zealand kidult horror-fantasy series
The Killian documents controversy, referring to forged documents containing allegations about George W. Bush's National Guard service that were publicized during the 2004 US presidential campaign
Jack Kilian, lead character in the TV series Midnight Caller (1988–1991)
Killian Gardiner, one of the main characters of Witches of East End
Captain Killian "Hook" Jones, a fictional character on the TV series Once Upon a Time
Killian or Kilian, a dance hold used in ice dancing where the dancers are side-by-side.
Cassandra Cillian, a main character in The Librarians (2014 TV series)
 Damon Killian, a key supporting character in the 1987 film The Running Man

See also
Jiří Kylián (born 1947), Czech dancer and choreographer

References

Irish masculine given names